The discography of The Lox, an American hip hop group consisting of rappers Jadakiss, Sheek Louch and Styles P and occasionally known under the name D-Block, consists of four studio albums, one compilation album, two extended plays, one mixtape and fifteen singles (including five as a featured artist).

Albums

Studio albums

Compilations

Mixtapes

EPs

Singles

As lead artist

As featured artist

Other charted songs

Guest appearances

Notes

See also
Jadakiss discography
Styles P discography
Sheek Louch discography

References

Hip hop discographies
Discographies of American artists